The 2000 Tour de Suisse was the 64th edition of the Tour de Suisse cycle race and was held from 13 June to 22 June 2000. The race started in Romanshorn and finished in Zürich. The race was won by Oscar Camenzind of the Lampre team.

Teams
Seventeen teams of eight riders started the race:

 
 
 
 
 
 
 
 
 
 
 
 
 
 
 
 
 Manheim Auctions–Mercury

Route

General classification

References

2000
Tour de Suisse